The Lithuania men's national under-20 basketball team (Lithuanian: Lietuvos nacionalinė vaikinų jaunimo iki 20 krepšinio rinktinė), is the representative for Lithuania in international basketball competitions, and it is organized and run by the Lithuanian Basketball Federation. The Lithuania men's national under-20 basketball team represents Lithuania at the FIBA Europe Under-20 Championship. The 2012 FIBA Europe Under-20 Championship champions generation (born 1992), led by Jonas Valančiūnas, won every single age-restricted tournament they have competed in. No other generation in the world have shown such impressive performance. Consequently, the unique Lithuanian generation was nicknamed "Auksinis Lietuvos jaunimas" (English: The Golden Lithuanian Youth).

Competitive record

FIBA Europe Under-20 Championship

Current roster
2019 FIBA U20 European Championship

External links
 Lithuanian Basketball Federation (LKF)

References

M U20
Men's national under-20 basketball teams